John Henry Lang (1 August 1896 – 29 November 1971) was a New Zealand rugby league footballer.

A stand-off, Lang represented Auckland provincially. Lang played for Maritime in the Auckland Rugby League competition from 1919 to 1921. During the 1921 season he applied for reinstatement into Rugby Union but was refused and when he returned to league he switched to the Marist Old Boys club.

He was a member of the 1919 New Zealand Kiwis team that played Australia. Lang played in the first test, but did not represent New Zealand again afterwards.

References 

1896 births
1971 deaths
New Zealand rugby league players
Auckland rugby league team players
Maritime Football Club players
Marist Saints players
New Zealand national rugby league team players
Rugby league five-eighths